Harrison Potter (May 9, 1891 – October 3, 1984) was an American pianist and educator.

Potter was born in North Adams, Massachusetts and studied piano with Felix Fox, and, in Paris, Isidor Philipp. Early in his career, Potter taught for a time at Boston's Fox-Buonamici Piano School. He also served as assistant conductor of the 301st Army Regiment Band during World War I. He performed widely as a recitalist and accompanist during his career.

Potter's recording of Charles Tomlinson Griffes' Piano Sonata is referenced in the 1943 first edition of Edward Maisel's biography of Griffes, though due to its unavailability at the time of the second edition, other recordings were referenced instead.

From 1946 to 1957, Potter taught at Mount Holyoke College. He was also the Chautauqua Institution's Choral Director from 1948 to 1952. Potter also taught at the Felix Fox School of Pianoforte Playing in Boston, Massachusetts and Sarah Lawrence College.

He died in Holyoke, Massachusetts in 1984.

Recordings
 Harrison Potter, piano, "Five Sketches in Sepia," by Ernest Bloch, Friends of Recorded Music, FRM-12 (78 RPM), 1937
 Harrison Potter, piano, "Piano Sonata," by Charles Tomlinson Griffes, Friends of Recorded Music, FRM-10-11 (78 RPM), 1937

Footnotes

1891 births
1984 deaths
American classical pianists
Male classical pianists
American male pianists
American music educators
People from North Adams, Massachusetts
Pupils of Isidor Philipp
20th-century classical pianists
20th-century American pianists
Classical musicians from Massachusetts
20th-century American male musicians

Mount Holyoke College faculty